Wolfram Grandezka (born 17 December 1969 in Saalfeld) is a German actor.

He landed the role of Roman Klingenberg in the soap opera Unter uns, playing the role from 5 January 1998 to 26 April 2000. He came to another soap, Verbotene Liebe, four years later. He has played Ansgar von Lahnstein, a charming villain, since 22 January 2004.

From 1999 to 2005, Grandezka was married to model Nadja Auermann and has a son, Nicolas Robert (born 1999), with her.

Filmography
 Unter uns (1998–2000), as Roman Klingenberg
 Verbotene Liebe (2004–2015), as Ansgar von Lahnstein
 Wilsberg: Callgirls (2006)
 Rote Rosen (2018–present), as Gregor Pasch

External links

1969 births
Living people
People from Saalfeld
German male soap opera actors